Progressive muscular atrophy (PMA), also called Duchenne–Aran disease and Duchenne–Aran muscular atrophy, is a disorder characterised by the degeneration of lower motor neurons, resulting in generalised, progressive loss of muscle function.

PMA is classified among motor neuron diseases (MND) where it is thought to account for around 4% of all MND cases.

PMA affects only the lower motor neurons, in contrast to amyotrophic lateral sclerosis (ALS), the most common MND, which affects both the upper and lower motor neurons, or primary lateral sclerosis, another MND, which affects only the upper motor neurons. The distinction is important because PMA is associated with a better prognosis than ALS.

Signs and symptoms
As a result of lower motor neuron degeneration, the symptoms of PMA include:
 muscle weakness
 muscle atrophy
 fasciculations

Some patients have symptoms restricted only to the arms or legs (or in some cases just one of either). These cases are referred to as flail limb (either flail arm or flail leg) and are associated with a better prognosis.

Diagnosis
PMA is a diagnosis of exclusion, there is no specific test which can conclusively establish whether a patient has the condition. Instead, a number of other possibilities have to be ruled out, such as multifocal motor neuropathy or spinal muscular atrophy. Tests used in the diagnostic process include MRI, clinical examination, and EMG. EMG tests in patients who do have PMA usually show denervation (neuron death) in most affected body parts, and in some unaffected parts too.

It typically takes longer to be diagnosed with PMA than ALS, an average of 20 months for PMA vs 15 months in ALS.

Differential diagnosis
In contrast to amyotrophic lateral sclerosis or primary lateral sclerosis, PMA is distinguished by the absence of:
 brisk reflexes
 spasticity
 Babinski's sign
 emotional lability
The importance of correctly recognizing progressive muscular atrophy as opposed to ALS is important for several reasons.
 The prognosis is a little better. A recent study found the 5-year survival rate in PMA to be 33% (vs 20% in ALS) and the 10-year survival rate to be 12% (vs 6% in ALS).
 Patients with PMA do not have the cognitive change identified in certain groups of patients with MND.
 Because PMA patients do not have UMN signs, they usually do not meet the World Federation of Neurology El Escorial Research Criteria for "Definite" or "Probable" ALS and so are ineligible to participate in the majority of clinical trials conducted in ALS.
 Because of its rarity (even compared to ALS) and confusion about the condition, some insurance policies or local healthcare policies may not recognize PMA as being the life-changing illness that it is. In cases where being classified as being PMA rather than ALS is likely to restrict access to services, it may be preferable to be diagnosed as "slowly progressive ALS" or "lower motor neuron predominant" ALS.

An initial diagnosis of PMA could turn out to be slowly progressive ALS many years later, sometimes even decades after the initial diagnosis. The occurrence of upper motor neuron symptoms such as brisk reflexes, spasticity, or a Babinski sign would indicate a progression to ALS; the correct diagnosis is also occasionally made on autopsy.

Prognosis 
The 5-year survival rate has been estimated at 33% and the 10-year survival rate at 12%.

History
Despite being rarer than ALS, PMA was described earlier, when in 1850 French neurologist François Aran described 11 cases which he termed atrophie musculaire progressive. Contemporary neurologist Guillaume-Benjamin-Amand Duchenne de Boulogne  also claimed to have described the condition 1 year earlier, although the written report was never found. The condition has been called progressive muscular atrophy (PMA), spinal muscular atrophy (SMA), Aran–Duchenne disease, Duchenne–Aran disease, Aran–Duchenne muscular atrophy, and Duchenne–Aran muscular atrophy. The name "spinal muscular atrophy" is ambiguous as it refers to any of various spinal muscular atrophies, including the autosomal recessive spinal muscular atrophy caused by a genetic defect in the SMN1 gene.

Disease or syndrome
Since its initial description in 1850, there has been debate in the scientific literature over whether PMA is a distinct disease with its own characteristics, or if lies somewhere on a spectrum with ALS, PLS, and PBP. Jean-Martin Charcot, who first described ALS in 1870, felt that PMA was a separate condition, with degeneration of the lower motor neurons the most important lesion, whereas in ALS it was the upper motor neuron degeneration that was primary, with lower motor neuron degeneration being secondary. Such views still exist in archaic terms for PMA such as "Primary progressive spinal muscular atrophy". Throughout the course of the late 19th century, other conditions were discovered which had previously been thought to be PMA, such as pseudo-hypertrophic paralysis, hereditary muscular atrophy, progressive myopathy, progressive muscular dystrophy, peripheral neuritis, and syringomyelia.

The neurologists Joseph Jules Dejerine and William Richard Gowers were among those who felt that PMA was part of a spectrum of motor neuron disease which included ALS, PMA, and PBP, in part because it was almost impossible to distinguish the conditions at autopsy. Other researchers have suggested that PMA is just ALS in an earlier stage of progression, because although the upper motor neurons appear unaffected on clinical examination there are in fact detectable pathological signs of upper motor neuron damage on autopsy.

Also, no gene has been linked specifically to PMA, and the disorder does not appear in the OMIM database.

In favour of considering PMA a separate disease, some patients with PMA live for decades after diagnosis, which would be unusual in typical ALS.

To this day, terminology around these diseases remains confusing because in the United Kingdom motor neurone disease refers to both ALS specifically and to the spectrum of ALS, PMA, PLS, and PBP. In the United States the most common terms are ALS (both specifically for ALS and as a blanket term) or Lou Gehrig's disease.

Notable cases
 Isaac W. Sprague - Entertainer and sideshow performer, billed as "the living human skeleton".
 Mike Gregory - Former Great Britain rugby league captain and head coach at Wigan RLFC
 Rob Rensenbrink - Former Netherlands and Anderlecht football player

References

External links 

P
Unsolved problems in neuroscience